St. Joseph is a Roman Catholic church in Brookfield, Connecticut, part of the  Diocese of Bridgeport.

History
A St. Joseph Mission Church has existed in Brookfield since the mid-1880s but the present parish was founded in 1941. The present St. Joseph Church was designed in the late 1980s by Antinozzi Associates now of Bridgeport, CT. The present church was dedicated in 1992.

Peragallo Pipe Organ
The organ was designed by the Peragallo Pipe Organ Company of Paterson, New Jersey. It is a pipe/digital 3 manual instrument and was originally installed in 2002. In August 2010 the Parish announced plans to bring Peragallo back to modify the instrument.

School
An elementary school located on the church property, originally Saint Joseph School, it was renamed Saint Joseph Catholic Academy in 2018 as it experimented with a new classroom model. Opening in 1958, it closed its doors in June, 2020.

References

External links 
 St. Joseph - website
 Diocese of Bridgeport

Roman Catholic churches in Connecticut
Christian organizations established in 1941
Buildings and structures in Brookfield, Connecticut
Churches in Fairfield County, Connecticut
1880s establishments in Connecticut